Renée Devillers (1902–2000) was a French stage and film actress.

Selected filmography
 The Sweetness of Loving (1930)
 The Man of the Hour (1937)
 J'accuse! (1938)
 The Blue Veil (1942)
 Roger la Honte (1946)
 Monelle (1948)
 The Last Vacation (1948)
 The Lame Devil (1948)
 Cartouche, King of Paris (1950)
 The Call of Destiny (1953)
 Mam'zelle Nitouche (1954)
 Thérèse Desqueyroux (1962)

References

Bibliography 
 Goble, Alan. The Complete Index to Literary Sources in Film. Walter de Gruyter, 1999.

External links 
 

1902 births
2000 deaths
French stage actresses
French film actresses
Actresses from Paris
20th-century French women